The Netherlands Football League Championship 1903–1904 was contested by seventeen teams participating in three divisions. This season, the western division had been split in two, creating the Eerste Klasse West-A and the Eerste Klasse West-B. The national champion would be determined by a play-off featuring the winners of the three divisions of the Netherlands. HBS Craeyenhout won this year's championship by beating Velocitas and PW.

New entrants
Eerste Klasse East:
GVC Wageningen, the result of a merger between last years competitors Go Ahead Wageningen and Victoria Wageningen

Eerste Klasse West-A:
Moved from Division West-B:
HBS Craeyenhout
Koninklijke HFC
Quick 1890

Eerste Klasse West-B:
Moved from Division West-A:
HFC Haarlem
HVV Den Haag
Velocitas

Divisions

Eerste Klasse East

Eerste Klasse West-A

Eerste Klasse West-B

Championship play-off

References
RSSSF Netherlands Football League Championships 1898-1954
RSSSF Eerste Klasse Oost
RSSSF Eerste Klasse West

Netherlands Football League Championship seasons
1903 in Dutch sport
1904 in Dutch sport